Events from the year 1856 in art.

Events
 May 1 – Charles Lutwidge Dodgson ('Lewis Carroll') takes up photography as a hobby
 August 25 – Dante Gabriel Rossetti first encounters Fanny Cornforth (Sarah Cox) in a London pleasure garden; the following day he sketches her head in his studio for the figure of a prostitute in his unfinished painting Found
 December 2 – The National Portrait Gallery, London, is established
 December 8 – Édouard Manet opens his own studio
 Owen Jones publishes The Grammar of Ornament, illustrated in chromolithography

Awards
 Austrian Imperial Prize for Sculpture – Joseph Boehm

Works

 Ivan Aivazovsky – A Strong Wind
 William-Adolphe Bouguereau – La Danse (approximate date)
 Ford Madox Brown – Take your Son, Sir! (unfinished)
 Philip Hermogenes Calderon – Broken Vows
 Samuel Colman – Meadows and Wildflowers at Conway
 John Faed – Portrait of George Washington Taking the Salute at Trenton
 William Powell Frith – Many Happy Returns of the Day
 Hiroshige – One Hundred Famous Views of Edo (ukiyo-e woodblock print series begins publication)
 Arthur Hughes – April Love
 William Holman Hunt – The Scapegoat (large version)
 Jean Auguste Dominique Ingres
 Madame Moitessier
 La Source
 Jozef Israëls – Passing Mother's Grave (Langs Moeders Graf)
 Sir Edwin Landseer – Saved
 Baron Carlo Marochetti – Richard Coeur de Lion (statue)
 John Everett Millais
 Autumn Leaves
 The Blind Girl
 Peace Concluded
 Jean-François Millet – Shepherdess Seated on a Rock
 Adeline Harris Sears - Quilt, Tumbling Blocks with Signatures pattern (quilt begun)
 Eugene von Guerard – View of Geelong
 Henry Wallis – The Death of Chatterton

Births
 January 7 – Charles Harold Davis, American landscape painter (died 1933)
 January 8 – Elizabeth Taylor, American painter (died 1932)
 January 12 – John Singer Sargent, Florentine-born American portrait painter (died 1925)
 March 8 – Colin Campbell Cooper, American impressionist painter (died 1937)
 March 9 – Tom Roberts, Australian painter (died 1931)
 March 11 – Georges Petit, French art dealer (died 1920)
 May 20 – Henri-Edmond Cross, French neo-impressionist painter (died 1910)
 October 9 - F. W. Pomeroy, English sculptor (died 1924)
 October 28
 Carolina Benedicks-Bruce, Swedish sculptor (died 1935)
 Anna Elizabeth Klumpke, American portrait and genre painter (died 1942)
 November 6 – Jefferson David Chalfant, American trompe-l'œil painter  (died 1931)
 November 11 - Alfred Drury, English sculptor (died 1944)
 November 18 – Joakim Skovgaard, Danish painter (died 1933)
 November 21 – Eveleen Tennant, English portrait photographer (died 1937)
 Undated – Harry Fidler, English equine painter (died 1935)

Deaths

 January 4 – David d'Angers (Pierre-Jean David), French sculptor and engraver (born 1788)
 April 5 – František Horčička, Czech history and portrait painter (born 1776)
 April 27 – Louis Joseph César Ducornet, French painter (used his feet) (born 1806)
 July 4 – István Ferenczy, Hungarian sculptor (born 1792)
 July 19 – Henry Aston Barker, Scottish landscape and panorama painter (born 1774)
 July 22 – Thomas Doughty, American landscape painter (born 1793)
 September 1 – Sir Richard Westmacott, English sculptor (born 1775)
 October – Rafael Tegeo, Spanish Neoclassical painter (born 1798)
 October 8 – Théodore Chassériau, French Romantic painter (born 1819)
 October 10 – Gim Jeong-hui, Korean calligrapher and artist (born 1786)
 October 25 – Naitō Toyomasa, Japanese sculptor of netsuke from Tanba Province (born 1773)
 October 28 – Johann Peter Krafft, German-Austrian painter (born 1780)
 November 4 – Hippolyte Delaroche, French painter (born 1797)
 November 6 – Cephas Thompson, American portrait painter (born 1775)
 November 13 – Ludwig Buchhorn, German painter and engraver (born 1770)
 November 21 – Charles de Steuben, French painter (born 1788)
 November 23 – Thomas Seddon, English landscape painter (born 1821)
 date unknown
 Pieter Godfried Bertichen, Dutch painter and lithographer (born 1796)
 Jean-Baptiste-Joseph Duchesne, French painter and miniaturist (born 1770)
 Elisabeth Charlotta Karsten, Swedish and Russian painter (born 1789)
 Frederick Nash, English painter and draughtsman (born 1782)

References

 
Years of the 19th century in art
1850s in art